Western Global Airlines, LLC is an American cargo airline based in Estero, Florida. The company's services include aircraft leasing, commercial charters and military charters. Its main hub is located at Southwest Florida International Airport in Fort Myers, Florida. In July 2018, the company established a  aircraft maintenance facility in Shreveport, Louisiana, capable of housing three wide-body aircraft simultaneously.

History
Western Global Airlines was founded on March 6, 2013, by Jim Neff. It was certified by the United States Department of Transportation on February 24, 2014 with FAA approval being granted on August 1, 2014 for operations using the McDonnell Douglas MD-11F. Boeing 747-400 freighter operations were approved by the FAA on November 16, 2015 and Department of Transportation approval was granted on May 25, 2016.

In June 2019, Flexport filed a complaint against Western Global Airlines, claiming that the airline failed to meet the reliability rate mandated by their contract.  On June 7, 2019, Western Global Airlines ceased operations for Flexport, which then switched to Atlas Air.

Fleet

As of May 2020, Western Global Airlines operates a fleet of 21 Boeing 747-400 freighters and McDonnell Douglas MD-11F:

Incidents
On February 13, 2016, Western Global Airlines Flight 4425, a McDonnell Douglas MD-11F (registered as N545JN) took off from Munich, Germany on a flight to King Shaka International Airport, South Africa carrying banknotes intended for the South African Reserve Bank. While making a fuel stop in Harare, Zimbabwe, the aircraft was impounded and its crew were arrested after ground staff reported seeing blood dripping from the aircraft. A subsequent search found a corpse in the lower compartment. Zimbabwean Police reported the man was likely a stowaway who died from a lack of oxygen. The crew and the aircraft were later released.

References 

Cargo airlines of the United States
Companies based in Sarasota, Florida
Airlines established in 2013
2013 establishments in Florida
Airlines based in Florida